Pinacocytes are flat cells found on the outside of sponges, as well as the internal canals of a sponge. Pinacocytes are not specific to the sponge however. It was discovered that pinacocytes do not have as many sponge specific genes. These genes suggest that pinacocytes had evolved before the metazoan time period, which is, before porifera had evolved.

Function
Pinacocytes are part of the epithelium in sponges. They play a role in movement (contracting and stretching), cell adhesion, signaling, phagocytosis, and polarity. Pinacocytes are filled with mesohyl which is a gel like substance that helps maintain the shape and structure of the sponge.

Types

Basipinacocytes 
These are the cells in contact with the sponge's substrate (the surface to which it is attached).

Exopinacocytes 
These are found on the exterior of the sponge. Exopinococytes produce spicules which is a needle like process that serves as structure for the organism.

Endopinacocytes 
These line the sponge's interior canals.

References

Cells
Sponge anatomy